N-Acetylneuraminic acid (Neu5Ac or NANA) is the predominant sialic acid found in human cells, and many mammalian cells. Other forms, such as N-Glycolylneuraminic acid, may also occur in cells.

This residue is negatively charged at physiological pH and is found in complex glycans on mucins and glycoproteins found at the cell membrane. Neu5Ac residues are also found in glycolipids, known as gangliosides, a crucial component of neuronal membranes found in the brain.

Along with involvement in preventing infections (mucus associated with mucous membranes—mouth, nose, GI, respiratory tract), Neu5Ac acts as a receptor for influenza viruses, allowing attachment to mucous cells via hemagglutinin (an early step in acquiring influenzavirus infection).

In the biology of bacterial pathogens
Neu5Ac is also important in the biology of a number of pathogenic and symbiotic bacteria as it can used either as a nutrient, providing both carbon and nitrogen to the bacteria, or in some pathogens, can be activated and placed on the cell surface. Bacteria have evolved transporters for Neu5Ac to enable them to capture it from their environment and a number of these have been characterized including the NanT protein from Escherichia coli, the SiaPQM TRAP transporter from Haemophilus influenzae and the SatABCD ABC transporter from Haemophilus ducreyi.

See also
 Neuraminic acid
 N-Glycolylneuraminic acid
 Sialic acid

References 

Amino sugars
Sugar acids
Monosaccharides